Franciszek Gąsior (21 April 1947 – 26 August 2021) was a Polish handball player who competed in the 1972 Summer Olympics and finished tenth with the Polish team.

References

External links
Profile 

1947 births
2021 deaths
Sportspeople from Tarnów
Polish male handball players
Olympic handball players of Poland
Handball players at the 1972 Summer Olympics